The 2021 Kolkata Municipal Corporation election was held on 19 December 2021 to elect 144 members of the Kolkata Municipal Corporation (KMC) which governs Kolkata, the capital of the Indian state of West Bengal. A total of 40,48,357 electors were eligible to vote in the election. The results were announced on 21 December. 

The All India Trinamool Congress (AITC) won the election by an overwhelming majority and captured 134 out of 144 wards. Firhad Hakim was elected as the mayor of Kolkata. In this election, Bharatiya Janata Party (BJP) won 3 seats, Left Front won 2 seats (CPI and CPI(M) won 1 seat each), Indian National Congress (INC) won 2 seats and independent candidates won 3 seats.

Schedule

Voter statistics
In this election, there were a total of 4,048,357 eligible electors. On 19 December 2,611,312 voters (64.50% of the total voters) exercised their franchise, of which 1,425,568 were male, 1,185,723 female and 21 registered voters were of the third gender.

Parties and alliances
Following is a list of political parties and alliances which contested in this election:

Candidates
A total of 950 candidates contested in this election. Among them 402 candidates were women. A list of the candidates (ward-wise) of the four main parties/alliance(s) is presented below:

Results
The results were declared on 21 December 2021.

Results by Parties

Results by Wards
The Ward-wise Results were announced by the West Bengal State Election Commission after the counting.

See also
 Kolkata Municipal Corporation
 2016 West Bengal Legislative Assembly election
 2018 West Bengal Panchayat elections
 2019 Indian general election in West Bengal
 2021 West Bengal Legislative Assembly election
 West Bengal Legislative Assembly by-elections (17th Session)
 2021 elections in India

References

Notes

Citations

Kolkata Municipal Corporation
2021 elections in India
Kolkata
Local elections in West Bengal